Anupama is a 1981 Indian Kannada-language romance drama film, directed by Renuka Sharma and written by Vietnam Veedu Sundaram. The film stars Anant Nag and Madhavi. The film had a successful score and soundtrack composed by C. Ashwath and L. Vaidyanathan.

Cast
 Anant Nag as Anant
 Madhavi as Anupama
 Balakrishna
 M. S. Umesh
 Kaminidharan
 B. K. Shankar
 Dingri Nagaraj
 Sudha Rani (credited as Baby Jayashree)
 Baby Thanuja

Soundtrack
All the songs were composed and scored by Ashwath - Vaidi, with lyrics by Doddarangegowda. The songs "Barthaale Kanasina Rani" and "Olume Poojegende" were instant hits and considered as evergreen songs in Kannada cinema.

References

External links 
 

1981 films
1980s Kannada-language films
Indian romantic drama films
1981 romantic drama films
Films directed by Renuka Sharma
Films scored by C. Ashwath
Films scored by L. Vaidyanathan